Fairfield Township is a township in Crow Wing County, Minnesota, United States. The population was 275 at the 2000 census.

Geography

Demographics
As of the census of 2000, there were 275 people, 125 households, and 86 families residing in the township.  The population density was 8.2 people per square mile (3.2/km2).  There were 264 housing units at an average density of 7.9/sq mi (3.0/km2).  The racial makeup of the township was 97.45% White, 0.73% African American, 0.36% Asian, and 1.45% from two or more races. Hispanic or Latino of any race were 1.45% of the population.

There were 125 households, out of which 15.2% had children under the age of 18 living with them, 61.6% were married couples living together, 2.4% had a female householder with no husband present, and 30.4% were non-families. 28.8% of all households were made up of individuals, and 14.4% had someone living alone who was 65 years of age or older.  The average household size was 2.20 and the average family size was 2.61.

In the township the population was spread out, with 15.6% under the age of 18, 5.1% from 18 to 24, 18.9% from 25 to 44, 32.0% from 45 to 64, and 28.4% who were 65 years of age or older.  The median age was 53 years. For every 100 females, there were 118.3 males.  For every 100 females age 18 and over, there were 112.8 males.

The median income for a household in the township was $29,375, and the median income for a family was $40,625. Males had a median income of $42,813 versus $21,250 for females. The per capita income for the township was $16,670.  About 6.1% of families and 14.6% of the population were below the poverty line, including 24.0% of those under the age of eighteen and 10.4% of those 65 or over.

References

Townships in Crow Wing County, Minnesota
Brainerd, Minnesota micropolitan area
Townships in Minnesota